Hypericum sampsonii is a species of flowering plant in the St. John's wort family, Hypericaceae. It occurs in China, Taiwan, Japan, Myanmar, and Vietnam. It is one of two species of Hypericum in the section Hypericum sect. Sampsonia.

Description
The flat-topped flowerhead has between 20 and 40 flowers, each flower  in diameter with 5 bright yellow petals. Each flower has 30–42 stamens, 3 styles, and 3-parted capsules. Hypericum sampsonii flowers between May and July and fruits between June and October.

Taxonomy
H. sampsonii was described in 1865 by Henry Fletcher Hance in the Journal of Botany, British and Foreign.  It was named for its collector, "T. Sampson", who collected specimens in June 1865 along muddy riverbanks "subject to overflows" near "Lukpo, 100 miles west of Canton" in southern China. The species was described as rare at that location.

Several authors placed this species in the section Hypericum sect. Drosocarpium, though it is now segregated into H. sect. Sampsonia, along with Hypericum assamicum, based on the combination of perfoliate leaf pairs and vesicular-glandular capsule valves.

Distribution and habitat
Hypericum sampsonii occurs in China, Taiwan, southern Japan, eastern Myanmar, and northern Vietnam. In China, it is found in Anhui, Fujian, Guangdong, Guangxi, Guizhou, Henan, Hubei, Hunan, Jiangsu, Jiangxi, Shaanxi, and Sichuan.

Chemistry
Hypericum sampsonii has been studied for potential use in medicine, including the treatment of "hematemesis, enteritis, traumatic hemorrhage, swellings, and cancer". It contains polycyclic polyprenylated acylphloroglucinols (PPAPs) including norsampsone.

References

sampsonii
Flora of China
Flora of Taiwan
Flora of Myanmar
Flora of Japan
Flora of Vietnam
Plants described in 1865